[[File:Page of Himmler Posen Speech, Oct 4, 1943.jpg|right|thumb|Authorised by Himmler himself, this original page of the final edition of his speech made on 4 October 1943 bears the Reichsführer-SSs statements to his audience that the extermination of the Jews, a policy of the Nazi state, is being carried out.]]

The Posen speeches''' were two speeches made by Heinrich Himmler, the head of the SS of Nazi Germany, on 4 and 6 October 1943 in the town hall of Posen (Poznań), in German-occupied Poland. The recordings are the first known documents in which a member of the Hitler Cabinet spoke of the ongoing extermination of the Jews in extermination camps. They demonstrate that the German government wanted, planned and carried out the Holocaust.

Overview
The Posen speeches of October 1943 are two of 132 speeches obtained in various forms which the head of the SS, Heinrich Himmler, conducted before officials of the Nazi party. The first speech was given before 92 SS officers, the second before Reichsleiters and Gauleiters, as well as other government representatives. They constitute some of the most important of Himmler's speeches during the war, as they demonstrate Himmler's role as "Architect of the Final Solution" and a visionary of an elite race to be henceforth supported by the SS state.

Although the genocide of the Jews was not the central topic in either of them, both carry historical significance in reference to it. Himmler dispensed with the usual euphemisms and spoke explicitly of the extermination of the Jews via mass murder, which he depicted as a historical mission of the Nazis. This connection became clear in five further speeches made between December 1943 and June 1944 to commanders of the Wehrmacht.

In the literature, only the first speech was known as the "Posen Speech" until 1970. The second speech, uncovered at that time, is often mistaken as the first or equated with it.

Historical context
Himmler gave the speeches at a time when German military setbacks were mounting and the Nazi political and military leadership were privately expressing alarm. At the Casablanca Conference in January, 1943, the Allies had decided that the only acceptable outcome of the war was Germany's unconditional surrender. The Soviet victory in the Battle of Stalingrad on 2 February 1943 was a turning point in the war. US President Franklin D. Roosevelt announced the prosecution of those mainly responsible for war and genocide on 12 February, which the US Congress agreed to on 18 March. Allied troops landed on Sicily on 7 July 1943 and successfully invaded the Italian mainland on the 3 September, and after the Italian armistice on 8 September, gradually advanced northward. On 1 October, Naples was freed from German occupation.

German hopes of regaining the military initiative on the Eastern front were dashed by the failure of the Battle of Kursk in early July, and the resultant massive Soviet counter offensive ushered in permanent German retreats for the remainder of the war. In the week 27 July – 3 August 1943, Allied air raids attacked Hamburg in Operation Gomorrah, and the armament centre of Peenemünde was heavily damaged by Operation Hydra on the night of 17–18 August, critically disrupting V-weapons development. At the same time resistance against German forces in the Western occupied territories grew, and a state of emergency was declared in Norway (17 August) and Denmark (29 August). German dissidents planned Germany's reorganisation (the Kreisau Circle) and assassination attempts on Adolf Hitler (which led to "Operation Walküre", 20 July 1944). A scorched earth policy was brought in on 4 September for retreats on the Eastern Front, and martial law against those in the armed forces who refused to follow orders, initially introduced by the General Government on 2 October.

In the same period, the destruction of the Jews became the most important goal. In the spring of 1943, Sonderaktion 1005 was in full operation, the exhumation and incineration of those murdered by the Einsatzgruppen across the whole Eastern Front, whose death toll had so far reached 1.8 million Jews. Himmler ordered the liquidation of all Jewish ghettos in German-occupied Poland on 11 June, and all Soviet ones on 21 June. As of 25 June, four new crematoria and gas chamber installations were completed in Auschwitz-II Birkenau at Auschwitz concentration camp. On 1 July all Jews in the Reich were placed under police law. On 24 August Himmler was appointed as minister of the interior, and thus all police forces in the Reich and occupied territories were subordinated to him. By 19 October, Operation Reinhard was to be terminated and the affiliated extermination camps dismantled.

Nonetheless, acts of resistance against the destruction of the Jews occurred. There were prisoner rebellions in Treblinka (2 August 1943) and Sobibor (14 October 1943). Jews of the Białystok ghetto mounted an insurrection against their liquidation (16–23 August), and the Danes helped most of the Danish Jews planned for arrest to escape.

Speech of 4 October 1943
Himmler did not prepare most of his speeches beforehand, but used terse handwritten notes instead. Since the end of 1942 his verbal lectures were no longer documented in shorthand, but recorded via phonograph onto wax master plates. These recordings were then typed up by SS-Untersturmführer Werner Alfred Wenn, who corrected obvious grammatical errors and supplemented missing words. Himmler then added his own handwritten corrections, and the thus authorised version was copied up via typewriter in large characters and then filed away.

Of Himmler's three-hour speech of 4 October 1943, 115 pages of the final typewritten edition (one page was lost) were discovered among SS files and submitted to the Nuremberg Trials as document 1919-PS. On day 23 of the hearing, a passage (which however did not concern the Holocaust) was read out. A live recording of this speech survives, allowing for the differences between the spoken and the copyedited version to be examined. They are minor, and in no case distortionary.

Addressees, reason and purpose

Himmler gave the first speech in the town hall of Posen, and not in the imperial palace as is often erroneously assumed. Of the SS's leadership cadre, 33 Obergruppenführer, 51 Gruppenführer and eight Brigadeführer from the whole of the Reich were present. Many of these came from areas of occupied eastern Europe. Large parts of the speech therefore concerned the increasingly precarious situation on the Eastern Front, while attempting to explain Soviet military successes as being due to a claimed combination of Communist ruthlessness and the weaknesses of Germany's allies.

Only about two minutes of the speech concerns the destruction of the Jews. Himmler assumes that his audience is experienced with mass shootings, ghetto liquidations and extermination camps, and accordingly, already possesses knowledge of them. The speech is to justify the crimes already perpetrated, and to commit its listeners to the "higher purpose" bestowed upon them. Around 50 officers not present were sent a copy of the speech and had to confirm their acknowledgment of it.

On the course of war
After a tribute to the war dead, Himmler gave his view of the war so far. The tough Soviet resistance could be attributed to the political commissars, the German Invasion of the Soviet Union was a preemptive strike and due to failure by Germany's allies, a chance for victory in 1942 was wasted. Himmler speculated over the Soviet army's potential, spoke disparagingly of the "Vlasov shivaree" (der Wlassow-Rummel), expatiated on the inferiority of the Slavic race, and included thoughts as to how a German minority can prevail over it.

In later passages, Himmler claimed Italy's army had been contaminated with communism and was                                                           sympathetic to the Western allies. He also touches upon the situation in the Balkans and other occupied territories, whose acts of resistance he disregards as irritating pinpricks. The war in the air and sea is also mentioned, as well as the domestic front (die innere Front) and factors from it such as enemy radio broadcasters and defeatism stemming from air raids.

Subsequently, Himmler turns to the situation on the enemy's side, speculating over the relationship between the United Kingdom and the United States and their resilience and readiness for war. He goes into extensive detail about variances in the SS, individual divisions, police organisations, and outlines his duties regarding economic operations of the SS and being a minister of the Reich.

Eastern Europe, Soviet prisoners of war

In his outline of the course of the war in the east, Himmler comments on the deaths of millions of Soviet prisoners of war and forced labourers. Like in pre-war speeches, and in accordance with Hitler's remarks in Mein Kampf, he speaks of how the eradication of the Slavic Untermensch is a historical and natural necessity. There is to be no place for sentiment:

"Extermination of the Jewish people"

Himmler explicitly speaks of the genocide of the Jews, something which had not been previously done by a representative of the Nazi party up until this point:

Himmler then praises the mindset of the SS man, devoting approximately 30 of the 116 pages to their virtues as well as their duty of becoming Europe's ruling class in 20 to 30 years.

Speech of 6 October 1943
Of the second Posen speech, Himmler's terse notes are available, as well as a version recorded via shorthand then typed up and corrected in detail, and the final version as authorised by Himmler himself. The speech in each of these stages resided in the files of the Personal Staff of the Reichsführer (Persönlichen Stabes Reichsführer-SS), which were seized in their entirety by U.S. authorities in 1945. The text of the speech was recorded into microfilm by the U.S. and released to the Bundesarchiv. Analysis of these previously unavailable documents by historian Erich Goldhagen in 1970 in Koblenz revealed a speech hitherto unknown. It was printed in its entirety for the first time in 1974 in Bradley Smith's and Agnes Peterson's book of selected Himmler speeches.

At the end of September 1943, the party chancellery invited all Reichsleiters and Gauleiters, the head of the Hitler Youth Artur Axmann and Reich ministers Albert Speer and Alfred Rosenberg to a conference. The conference began on 6 October at 9 o'clock in the morning with Speer's reports, his speakers, and four big industries for armament production. Talks from Karl Dönitz and Erhard Milch followed. Himmler held his speech from 17:30 to 19:00. The second speech is shorter than the first, but contains a slightly longer and more explicit passage regarding the genocide of the Jews.

Beginning of the speech
Himmler begins by discussing partisans in Russia and support from Russian Liberation Army, Vlasov's collaborationist forces. The widespread idea that there would be a 300 kilometre wide belt dominated by partisans behind the German front is considered false. Frequently expressed is the view that Russia can only be conquered by Russians. This view is considered to be dangerous and wrong. Slavs are to be considered unreliable on a matter of principle, and for that reason, Russian Hiwis may only be employed as combatants in mixed units.

The danger of infiltrated parachutists, fugitive POWs and forced labourers is considered marginal, since the German population is in an impeccable way and grants the opponent no shelter, and the police have such dangers under control. A request by Gauleiters for a special force against the insurgency in the country is considered to be unnecessary and unacceptable.

On the "Jewish question"
Himmler then reveals to "this most secret circle" his thoughts on the Jewish question, which he describes as "the most difficult decision of my life".

Himmler then discusses the Warsaw Ghetto Uprising (19 April – 16 May 1943) and the heavy battles during it:

This last sentence seems to refer to the upcoming Operation Harvest Festival where the remaining Jewish forced laborers in the Lublin District of German-occupied Poland were liquidated. 43,000 Jews were murdered in this operation on 3-4 November 1943.

Himmler discusses the dismissal of Benito Mussolini, which is to have led to defeatism. A few death sentences imposed on the basis of making corrosive remarks are to serve as dissuasive warnings for thousands of others, and party members must display exemplary behaviour. Himmler then discusses his duties as Reich minister of the interior. By Hitler's volition, party organisation and administrative organisation are henceforth two separate pillars. Decentralized decisions are considered important, but centralised arrangements take precedence in the strained war situation. As a result, Himmler makes broad criticism of the personal politics of Gauleiters. In the last part of his speech, he goes into the benefits of the Waffen-SS. Himmler closes by discussing how the German national boundary will be pushed 500 km eastwards with 120 million people being relocated, and ends with the appeal:

Albert Speer, Reich minister for arms and munition since 1942, was, since 2 September 1943 as Reich minister for armament and wartime economy, responsible for all German armament production. This used Jewish forced labourers who were partly exempted from being deported to their extermination until 1943. After 1945, Speer always maintained that he left the conference before Himmler made his speech and knew nothing of the Holocaust. Historians cite Himmler's direct second person reference to Speer as proof of his presence.

Further speeches
Statements from five further speeches by Himmler confirm the sentiment he expressed in Posen on the "final solution to the Jewish question". On 16 December 1943, he said to Kriegsmarine commanders:

A handwritten memo from Himmler's speech on 26 January 1944 in Posen to Generals of fighting troops reads:

On 5 May 1944 Himmler explained to Generals in Sonthofen that perseverance in the bombing war has only been possible because the Jews in Germany have been discarded.

Applause can be heard on a recording of another speech given to Generals in Sonthofen on 24 May 1944, when Himmler says:

On 21 June 1944 Himmler spoke to Generals educated in the Nazi world view in Sonthofen, mentioning the Jewish question again:

Historical reception
The destruction of the Jews was to be kept secret from those outside the Nazi regime, but could only be organised and carried out with the participation of all relevant state and party executives. The Posen speeches offer a retrospective look at the mass killings already carried out, and show how these and further killings were ideologically justified by the Party. The extermination of the "internal enemy" (innerer Feind), the Jewish race, had become an objective of the war, and success in this field was to compensate for other defeats accrued in the course of the war.

Saul Friedländer highlights Himmler's self-image as an unconditionally obedient executor of Hitler's plans for the Germanic "Lebensraum in the east".

Konrad Kwiet comments on Himmler's association of the "heaviest task" the SS ever had to perform with the Anständigkeit (decency) that had been preserved of it:

Hans Buchheim comments that the accused perpetrators very probably lacked a mens rea ("guilty mind"). Himmler's revaluation of soldierly virtues was not a total negation of moral norms, but a suspension of them for the exceptional situation of the extermination of the Jews, which had been passed off as a historical necessity. Therefore, Himmler endorsed the murder of the Jews not by instruction, but via the "correct" ideological motives, while letting similar murders committed out of sadism or selfishness be prosecutable.

Historian Dieter Pohl states:

The unsparing portrayal of the genocide in Himmler's speech is thus interpreted as a means to formally render senior SS and Nazi functionaries as co-conspirators and accomplices in the perpetration of the Holocaust.

Joseph Goebbels alludes to this view in his diary entry of 2 March 1943:

In an entry dated 9 October 1943, Goebbels commented on Himmler's second speech, at which he was present:

Holocaust denial

Holocaust deniers have frequently attempted to negate Himmler's speeches as proof of the Holocaust. In particular, where Himmler – in his speech of 4 October 1943 – refers to the "Ausrottung des jüdischen Volkes" (extermination of the Jewish people), they will read the verb ausrotten (literally to "root out", aus = out; rott = root) and its related noun Ausrottung to offer a much more benign interpretation, i.e., Himmler was merely referring to the deportation of Jews and a desire to "root them out", as opposed to their mass destruction.Ausrotten can mean "to stamp out/to root out", but only figuratively, e.g., in contexts of concepts or ideals. In the context of living things (such as a people or race), ausrotten accordingly means destroying something so that it cannot return. David Irving considers the usage of the word "Ausrotten" vitally important and also agrees that the term was referring to eradication. He confirms this in an interview from 2007 when he compares its usage with Goebbels half-word "Ausrott..." during the Sportpalast speech from February 1943. In the subsequent paragraph, Himmler compares his disdain for individuals gaining personally (e.g. stealing) from Jewish victims, and the necessity to prevent this personal gain, to becoming sick and dying "from the same bacillus that we have exterminated" (weil wir den Bazillus ausrotten, an dem Bazillus krank werden und sterben). This use of ausrotten can be read as killing or extermination in the context of living things, because arguing for the deportation of bacteria would make no sense. The reference to a bacillus in this statement is figurative, however, in line with Nazi rhetoric that encouraged dehumanizing concepts of Jews as a pathogen or malignant presence, rather than people.

In the "Ausrottung des jüdischen Volkes" paragraph, Himmler says:

Himmler thus confirms that the context is explicitly physical extermination, since umbringen simply has no meaning other than "to kill". Because of this, critics explain that Holocaust deniers will arbitrarily select words from the dictionary that have nothing to do with the given context, such as cherry-picking the definition for Unkraut (weeds) and erroneously applying it to Volk (people).

In the second speech in Posen, critics point to the fact that he defines the meaning of ausrotten, where the operative word is umbringen.

Holocaust deniers will also offer erroneous translations of ausrotten by analysing the word's compounds, on the basis that "aus" and "rotten" are cognate with the English "out" and "root". To native German speakers, this is simply wrong. Critics compare this attempted etymological explanation to an attempt to cite the Latin origins of "ex" (out of) and "terminus" (borders) and on that basis, claim that "exterminate" means deportation, which would be equally nonsensical to native English speakers.

Critics point out that German Holocaust deniers do not dare suggest a translation to a German audience where ausrotten does not mean physical extermination, citing instances of German deniers dismissing failed etymological analysis by English speakers by responding to confirm that ausrotten means complete destruction, and material written by German deniers where, in the context of people, ausrotten and vernichten are used synonymously.

Germar Rudolf and Udo Walendy have claimed that the recording of the first speech is a forgery: Himmler's voice was actually that of a 1945 Allied voice imitator. However, the discovery of the second Posen speech in the Koblenz Bundesarchiv rendered allegations of falsification completely irrelevant. Himmler's explicit statements, such as making the decision to make the Jews "disappear from the earth", leave no room for alternative interpretation.

Artistic references
In Romuald Karmakar's 2000 film The Himmler Project, the actor Manfred Zapatka reads the entire speech of 4 October 1943 word for word according to the recording, including all the nuances and incidents also recorded and the repetitions where Himmler loses his place while reading from a prepared manuscript. During the film, Zapatka wears no uniform and simply stands in front of a grey wall.

Heinrich Breloers multipart television film Speer und Er contains a debate as to whether Albert Speer was present during Himmler's speech on 6 October 1943.

In Jonathan Littell's The Kindly Ones, the first-person narrator, Maximilian Aue, cannot remember whether Speer was present or not, but does cite Speer's remark that he (Speer) remembered many officers being terribly drunk. As Speer arrived in the morning for his speech, this would actually mean Speer was still present during the evening's dinner, after Himmler's second Posen speech.

See also
Incitement to genocide
New Order (Nazism)

References

Bibliography
Internationaler Militärgerichtshof Nürnberg (IMT): Der Nürnberger Prozess gegen die Hauptkriegsverbrecher. Delphin Verlag, Nachdruck München 1989, Band 29: Urkunden und anderes BeweismaterialBradley F. Smith, Agnes F. Peterson (Hrsg.): Heinrich Himmler. Geheimreden 1933–1945, Propyläen Verlag, Frankfurt am Main, Berlin/Wien 1974, 
Peter Longerich: Der ungeschriebene Befehl, Munich 2001, 
Richard Breitman: Himmler und die Vernichtung der europäischen Juden.'' Schöningh, Sammlung zur Geschichte und Gegenwart, 1996,

External links

Full text of Himmler's speech (in German)
Holocaust History Project: Text of the Quick Time excerpt of Poznan Speech in German and English
Nizkor: Himmler's October 4, 1943 Posen Speech, 5 minute excerpt

Heinrich Himmler
History of Poznań
Holocaust historical documents
1943 in Germany
Planning the Holocaust
Speeches by Nazis
October 1943 events
1943 in Poland
1943 speeches
20th century in Poznań